Wien's approximation (also sometimes called Wien's law or the Wien distribution law) is a law of physics used to describe the spectrum of thermal radiation (frequently called the blackbody function).  This law was first derived by Wilhelm Wien in 1896.  The equation does accurately describe the short wavelength (high frequency) spectrum of thermal emission from objects, but it fails to accurately fit the experimental data for long wavelengths (low frequency) emission.

Details
Wien derived his law from thermodynamic arguments, several years before Planck introduced the quantization of radiation.

Wien's original paper did not contain the Planck constant. In this paper, Wien took the wavelength of black body radiation and combined it with the Maxwell–Boltzmann distribution for atoms.  The exponential curve was created by the use of Euler's number e raised to the power of the temperature multiplied by a constant.  Fundamental constants were later introduced by Max Planck.  

The law may be written as

(note the simple exponential frequency dependence of this approximation) or, by introducing natural Planck units:

where:
 is the amount of energy per unit surface area per unit time per unit solid angle per unit frequency emitted at a frequency ν.
 is the temperature of the black body.
 is the ratio of frequency over temperature.
 is the Planck constant.
 is the speed of light.
 is the Boltzmann constant.

This equation may also be written as

where  is the amount of energy per unit surface area per unit time per unit solid angle per unit wavelength emitted at a wavelength λ.

The peak value of this curve, as determined by setting the derivative of the equation equal to zero and solving, occurs at a wavelength λmax and frequency νmax of:

Relation to Planck's law

The Wien approximation was originally proposed as a description of the complete spectrum of thermal radiation, although it failed to accurately describe long wavelength (low frequency) emission.  However, it was soon superseded by Planck's law which accurately describes the full spectrum. Planck's law may be given as

The Wien approximation may be derived from Planck's law by assuming .  When this is true, then

and so Planck's law approximately equals the Wien approximation at high frequencies.

Other approximations of thermal radiation

The Rayleigh–Jeans law developed by Lord Rayleigh may be used to accurately describe the long wavelength spectrum of thermal radiation but fails to describe the short wavelength spectrum of thermal emission.

See also
 ASTM Subcommittee E20.02 on Radiation Thermometry
 Sakuma–Hattori equation
 Ultraviolet catastrophe
 Wien's displacement law

References

Statistical mechanics
Electromagnetic radiation
1896 in science
1896 in Germany